The 2016 Vuelta a Costa Rica, the 52nd edition of the Vuelta a Costa Rica, was held from December 13 to 25 December 25, 2016.

Route

Classifications

References

Costa Rica
2017 UCI America Tour
2016 in Costa Rican sport